The Princeton Tigers men's basketball team is the intercollegiate men's basketball program representing Princeton University. The school competes in the Ivy League in Division I of the National Collegiate Athletic Association (NCAA). The Tigers play home basketball games at the Jadwin Gymnasium in Princeton, New Jersey on the university campus. Princeton has appeared in 25 NCAA tournaments, most recently in 2023. In 1965, the Tigers made the NCAA Final Four, with Bill Bradley being named the Most Outstanding Player. The team is currently coached by former player Mitch Henderson.

The team is known for the Princeton offense strategy, perfected under the tenure of former head coach Pete Carril, who coached the team from 1967 to 1996. The Princeton offense has resulted in Princeton leading the nation in scoring defense 20 times since 1976, including every year from 1989 to 2000. As of 2023, the Tigers have amassed 1803 victories, 25 NCAA Division I men's basketball tournament appearances (including four consecutive appearances between 1989 and 1992), and 32 Ivy League regular season titles. Their main Ivy League rivalry is with Penn.

Eight different Tigers have earned 12 All-American recognitions. Bill Bradley is the only three-time honoree.  Numerous Tigers have played professional basketball.  The most recent Tiger NBAer was Steve Goodrich. Geoff Petrie was the NBA Rookie of the Year in 1971, while Brian Taylor earned the same honor in the American Basketball Association in 1973. Two of the three Ivy Leaguers to have played in the Olympic games were Tigers. Four of the eight NBA and ABA championships earned by Ivy League players have been earned by Tigers. Three of the five highest NBA career point totals by Ivy League players were by Tigers. Five of the ten Ivy League players selected among the top 25 overall selections in the NBA draft were Tigers.

Coaches

Carril holds the Ivy League record for most career seasons, championships, and wins. Bill Carmody holds the career winning percentage record.

Coaching Records

Arenas
Princeton originally played its home games at University Gymnasium until it burned down in 1944.  Hobey Baker Memorial Rink served as the interim home court for the 1945–46 and 1946–47 seasons until Dillon Gymnasium was built.  The 6,800-seat Jadwin Gymnasium hosted the Tigers for the first time on January 25, 1969 against the Penn Quakers men's basketball team. It continues to be the team's home court.

Ivy League
The Tigers have played against their Ivy League foes for over a century.

Through 2017–2018 season

Awards and honors

Bill Bradley has won numerous distinctions as a Princeton Tiger.  He is the team's only Rhodes Scholar, and he is the only player to earn NCAA basketball tournament Most Outstanding Player. Other honors earned by Tiger basketball players include:

All-Americas

Ivy League Men's Basketball Player of the Year	

	
			
Ivy League Rookie of the Year
	
			
Ivy League Defensive Player of the Year

Ivy League Coach of the Year

Academic All-Americas

Olympians

College Basketball Hall of Fame

Basketball Hall of Fame

Professional basketball
Princeton NBA players were Bud Palmer, Willem van Breda Kolff, Bradley, Geoff Petrie, John Hummer, Taylor, Ted Manakas, Armond Hill, Mike Kearns and Steve Goodrich.

Devin Cannady is the only active Princeton NBA player.

David Blatt, now an Israeli-American, played for Princeton in 1977–81 and then became a professional basketball player and subsequently a coach (most recently, for the Cleveland Cavaliers).

NBA/ABA Champiohips

NBA Experience

NBA draft

Records
Bradley continues to hold the single-game, single-season, and career total and average points Ivy League records. In addition, he holds the Ivy records for single-game, single-season, and career field goals made as well as single-season, and career free throws made. Other Tiger Ivy League record holders include Howard Levy (1982–85, career field goal percentage), Alan Williams (1986–87, single-season field goal percentage), Brian Earl (1995–99, career three-point field goals made), Spencer Gloger (vs- Ala.-Birmingham, December 18, 1999, single-game three-point field goals made), Sydney Johnson (-vs- Columbia & Cornell, Feb 28 – March 1, 1997, consecutive three-point field goals made; single-game three-point field goals made with no misses), Dave Orlandini (1986–88, career three-point field goal percentage; 1987–88 single-season three-point field goal percentage).

National records
Combined single-game Three-point field goal field goal percentage (minimum 20 made):  72.4%—Princeton (12 of 15) vs. Brown (9 of 14), February 20, 1998
Combined single-game points (Since 1986, which is either the three-point shot or shot clock era): 62—Monmouth (41) vs. Princeton (21), December 14, 2005
Single-season three-point field goal percentage (Min. 200 made): 49.2%—Princeton, 1988 (211 of 429)
Longest annual rivalry Princeton–Yale: Since 1902 (tied with Columbia–Yale, Princeton–Penn is second since 1903)

NCAA Men's Division I Basketball Championship Tournament records
Free throws made in 100% effort: Bradley (16 vs. St. Joseph’s, 1st R, November 3, 1963)
Single-game points scored in a final four: Bradley 58 Princeton vs. Wichita St., N3d, 3-20- 1965 
Single-game field goals made (final four): Bradley 22 Princeton vs. Wichita St., N3d, 3-20- 1965
Victory margin (final four): 36 Princeton (118) vs. Wichita St. (82), N3d, March 20, 1965
Points in a half, team (final four): 65, Princeton vs. Wichita St., N3d, March 20, 1965 (2d half, 2nd team to do so)
Single-year two-game points scored (final four): 87, Bill Bradley, Princeton, 1965
Single-year two-game field goals made (final four): 34, Bill Bradley, Princeton, 1965

Selected former records NCAA Men's Division I Basketball Championship Tournament records
Single-game free throw percentage (final four, minimum 10 made): 93.3% (14–15), Bradley, Princeton vs. Wichita St., N3d, March 25, 1965 (broken March 23, 1972)
Points in a half, both teams (final four): 108, Princeton (65) vs. Wichita St. (43), N3d, March 20, 1965 (2d) (broken March 25, 1972)
Single-year two-game free throw percentage (final four, minimum 12 made): 95.0% (19–20), Bill Bradley, Princeton, 1965 (broken 1972)
Single-year two-game field goals made (final four): 78, Princeton, 1965 (broken 1977)

Former national records
Fewest points allowed (Since 1986): 28–66 Dartmouth, February 10, 1990 (broken on January 11, 1991)
Fewest points allowed (Since 1986): 27–55 Yale, January 11, 1991 (broken on March 2, 1992)
Fewest combined points (Since 1986): 76 (43–33) vs. Colgate, November 30, 1988 (broken on December 16, 1989)
Single-season team defense (Since 1965): 52.9, 1976 (broken 1977)
Single-season team defense (Since 1965): 51.7, 1977 (broken 1980)
Single-season team assists-turnover ratio (Since 1993): 1.63 (486:302), 1998 (broken 2005)
Consecutive home victories: Princeton over Brown 52, 1929–2002 (broken by North Carolina over Clemson 54 and active through 2009)

National statistical champions
Field goal percentage: 70.3% Alan Williams 163 of 232, 1987
Three-point field goal percentage: 53.4% Matt Lapin 71 of 133, 1990
Free throw percentage: 88.6% Bill Bradley, 273 of 308, 1965
Free throw percentage: 90.0% Joe Heiser, 117 of 130, 1968
Won-loss percentage: 93.1% team, 27 of 29, 1998
Scoring defense: 52.9, 1976; 51.7, 1977; 55.8, 1979; 52.0, 1983; 50.1, 1984; 55.0, 1986; 53.0, 1989; 51.0, 1990; 48.9, 1991; 48.2, 1992; 54.7, 1993; 52.3, 1994; 57.7, 1995; 51.7, 1996; 53.4, 1997; 51.4, 1998; 52.7, 1999; 54.6, 2000; 53.3, 2007; 53.3, 2010.
Field goal percentage: 54.1% team, 601 of 1111, 1987
Three-point field goals/game: 8.12 team, 1988
Three-point field percentage: 49.2 team, 1988, 45.2 team, 1990
Assists-turnover ratio: 1.63 team (486:302), 1998
Fewest turnover/game: 10.14 team (294/29), 1998
The 1925 team is considered the retroactive national champion by the Helms Athletic Foundation and the Premo-Porretta Power Poll.

Selected notable statistics
Bradley was the second to post a 2000-point/1000-rebound three-year career (Oscar Robertson).
Weisz became the only player in Princeton career history to amass 1,000 points, 500 rebounds, 300 assists, and 200 3-pointers.
The 27-point comeback from 13–40 with 15:11 remaining to win 50–49 over Penn on February 9, 1999 remains the fifth-largest comeback and fourth-largest second-half comeback in NCAA history. That game's 9–33 half time deficit comeback remains the second-largest comeback.
14 of the top 25 single-season team defensive averages since 1965 have been by Princeton.
Princeton ranked in the top 10 nationally in win percentage in both the 1960s (72.6, 188–71, 10th), and 1990s (76.1, 210–66, 8th).
Last Princeton team ranked in the polls during the season and at the end of the season was the 1997–98 team, which was ranked in all but the first three polls (15 weeks) of the season and finished the season 8th.
Other ranked teams according to the AP Poll 1950–51 (2 weeks, peak 18, finished unranked), 1966–67 (9 weeks, peak 3, finished 5), 1967–68 (2 weeks, peak 8, finished unranked, but 15 by UPI since AP was only top 10 at the time), 1971–72 (3 weeks, peak 14, finished unranked), 1974–75 (2 weeks, peak 12, finished 12), 1975–76 (2 weeks, peak 15, finished unranked, but 19T by UPI), 1990–91 (6 weeks, peak 18, finished 18).

Postseason
Princeton has appeared in 25 NCAA Division I men's basketball tournaments, 6 National Invitation Tournaments (NIT), 2 College Basketball Invitationals (CBI) and 8 Ivy League one-game playoffs.

NCAA Tournaments

NCAA Tournament Seeding History

The NCAA began seeding the NCAA Division I men's basketball tournament with the 1979 edition. The 64-team field started in 1985, which guaranteed that a championship team had to win six games.

The Tigers have a 15–29 record in the NCAA tournament.

In 2011 the round of 64 was the second round

NIT

CBI

Notes

External links
 

 
Basketball teams established in 1901